Sullivan County Courthouse may refer to:

Sullivan County Courthouse (Indiana)
Sullivan County Courthouse (Missouri)
Sullivan County Courthouse (New Hampshire)
Sullivan County Courthouse (New York)
Sullivan County Courthouse (Pennsylvania)
Sullivan County Courthouse (Tennessee)